German submarine U-449 was a Type VIIC U-boat of Nazi Germany's Kriegsmarine during World War II.

She carried out one patrol. She sank no ships.

She was sunk by British warships northwest of Cape Ortegal, Spain on 24 June 1943.

Design
German Type VIIC submarines were preceded by the shorter Type VIIB submarines. U-449 had a displacement of  when at the surface and  while submerged. She had two shafts and two  propellers.

U-449 was fitted with five  torpedo tubes (four fitted at the bow and one at the stern), fourteen torpedoes, one  SK C/35 naval gun, 220 rounds, and a  C/30 anti-aircraft gun. The boat had a complement of between forty-four and sixty.

Service history
The submarine was laid down on 17 July 1941 at Schichau-Werke in Danzig (now Gdansk) as yard number 1520, launched on 13 June 1942 and commissioned on 22 August under the command of Oberleutnant zur See Hermann Otto.

The U-449 served with the 8th U-boat Flotilla from 22 August 1942 for training and the 7th flotilla from 1 May 1943 for operations.

Patrol and loss
U-432s only patrol began with her departure from Kiel in Germany on 1 June 1942. She headed for the Atlantic Ocean, via the gap separating Iceland and the Faroe Islands. On the 14th, she was attacked in mid-Atlantic by a British B-24 Liberator of No. 120 Squadron RAF. The damage caused was slight.

On 24 June, no less than four British sloops were responsible for her doom.

Forty-nine men went down with U-449; there were no survivors.

References

Bibliography

External links

German Type VIIC submarines
U-boats commissioned in 1942
U-boats sunk in 1943
U-boats sunk by depth charges
1942 ships
Ships built in Danzig
Ships lost with all hands
U-boats sunk by British warships
World War II submarines of Germany
World War II shipwrecks in the Atlantic Ocean
Maritime incidents in June 1943
Ships built by Schichau